Erjon Llapanji (born 10 May 1985) is an Albanian football retired goalkeeper who played for Skënderbeu Korçë in the Albanian Superliga.

Honours

Clubs
Skënderbeu Korçë
 Albanian Superliga (5): 2010–11, 2011–12, 2012–13, 2013–14, 2014–15
 Albanian Cup Runner–up (1): 2011–12
 Albanian Supercup (2): 2013, 2014

References

External links

1985 births
Living people
Footballers from Korçë
Albanian footballers
Association football goalkeepers
Albania under-21 international footballers
KF Skënderbeu Korçë players
Bilisht Sport players
Kategoria Superiore players